Richard Edward Cavazos (January 31, 1929 – October 29, 2017) was a United States Army four-star general. He was a Korean War recipient of the Distinguished Service Cross as a first lieutenant and advanced in rank to become the United States Army's first Hispanic four-star general. During the Vietnam War, as a lieutenant colonel, Cavazos was awarded a second Distinguished Service Cross. In 1976, Cavazos became the first Mexican-American to reach the rank of brigadier general in the United States Army. Cavazos served for thirty-three years, with his final command as head of the United States Army Forces Command.  On May 25, 2022, The Naming Commission recommended that Fort Hood be renamed to Fort Cavazos, in recognition of Gen. Cavazos's military service. Defense Secretary Lloyd Austin ordered the renaming on October 6, 2022.

Early life and education
Richard Cavazos, a Mexican-American, was born on January 31, 1929, in Kingsville, Texas. His brother is former United States Secretary of Education, Lauro Cavazos. He earned a Bachelor of Science degree in geology from Texas Technological College (now Texas Tech University) in 1951, where he played on the football team and was a distinguished graduate of the Reserve Officers' Training Corps program. He received further military education at the Command and General Staff College, the British Army Staff College, the Armed Forces Staff College, and the United States Army War College. He received basic officer training at Fort Benning, Georgia, followed by training at Airborne School. He then deployed to Korea with the 65th Infantry.

Military career

Korean War
During the Korean War, as a member of the 65th Infantry Regiment, a unit of mostly natives of Puerto Rico, he distinguished himself, receiving both the Silver Star and Distinguished Service Cross for his heroic actions.

On February 25, 1953, Cavazos's Company E was attacked by the enemy.  During the fight against a numerically superior enemy force, Cavazos distinguished himself and received the Silver Star for his actions. His company was able to emerge victorious from the battle. On June 14, 1953, Cavazos again distinguished himself during an attack on Hill 142, and was awarded the Distinguished Service Cross for his heroic actions on that day.

Distinguished Service Cross citation (first award)
On September 10, 1953, per General Orders No. 832, Cavazos was awarded the Distinguished Service Cross for his actions during the Korean War. His citation reads:

Vietnam War
In February 1967, Cavazos, then a lieutenant colonel, became commander of the 1st Battalion, 18th Infantry Regiment. In October and November 1967, his battalion was engaged in fighting near the Cambodian border. During an attack at Loc Ninh in October 1967, his unit was able to repulse the enemy. For his valiant leadership at Loc Ninh, he was awarded a second Distinguished Service Cross.

Distinguished Service Cross citation (second award)
On December 17, 1967, per General Orders No. 6479, Lieutenant Colonel Cavazos was awarded his second Distinguished Service Cross for his actions on October 30, 1967. His citation reads:

Post-Vietnam
After Vietnam, Cavazos served as commander of the 2nd Brigade, 1st Infantry Division, and commander, 9th Infantry Division.

In 1976, Cavazos became the first Hispanic to reach the rank of brigadier general in the United States Army. In 1980, he became commander of III Corps.

In 1982, Cavazos again made military history by being appointed the army's first Hispanic four-star general. The same year, Cavazos assumed command of the United States Army Forces Command. His early support for the National Training Center and his involvement in the development of the Battle Command Training Program enormously influenced the war fighting capabilities of the United States Army.

On June 17, 1984, after thirty three years of distinguished service, General Cavazos retired from the United States Army.

In retirement
In 1985, Cavazos was appointed to the Chemical Warfare Review Committee by President Reagan.  Cavazos served on the Board of Regents of his alma mater, Texas Tech University.

Personal
Born in Kingsville, Texas, Cavazos grew up on King Ranch. Cavazos was married with four children. He resided in San Antonio, Texas.

He was the brother of Lauro Cavazos, former Texas Tech University president and former United States Secretary of Education.

Cavazos died at the age of 88 in San Antonio on October 29, 2017, due to complications of Alzheimer's disease. He is buried with full military honors at Fort Sam Houston National Cemetery.

Awards and decorations
Cavazos's military awards include two Distinguished Service Crosses, Army Distinguished Service Medal, a Silver Star, Defense Superior Service Medal, two Legion of Merit awards, five Bronze Star Medals, the Purple Heart, the Combat Infantryman Badge, a Parachutist Badge. Cavazos has also been awarded an honorary lifetime membership in the National Guard Association of Texas; was inducted into the Fort Leavenworth Hall of Fame and Ranger Regiment Association Hall of Fame; and received the Doughboy Award of National Infantry Association, 1991.

Naming of Fort Cavazos 
The 2021 Defense Authorization Act directed the removal of names that "honor or commemorate the Confederate States of America." A goal of  The Naming Commission is to inspire service members from diverse communities by giving military facilities "proud new names that are rooted in their local communities and that honor American heroes whose valor, courage, and patriotism exemplify the very best of the United States military."

On May 25, 2022, The Naming Commission recommended that Fort Hood be renamed to Fort Cavazos, in recognition of Gen. Cavazos's military service. Defense Secretary Lloyd Austin ordered the renaming on October 6, 2022.

See also

Borinqueneers Congressional Gold Medal

Notes

References

Hispanic Americans in the U.S. Army

1929 births
2017 deaths
American people of Mexican descent
Military personnel from San Antonio
Recipients of the Distinguished Service Cross (United States)
Recipients of the Legion of Merit
Recipients of the Silver Star
Recipients of the Distinguished Service Order (Vietnam)
Texas Tech University alumni
Texas Tech University System regents
United States Army Command and General Staff College alumni
United States Army generals
University of Texas at Arlington alumni
People from Kingsville, Texas
Burials at Fort Sam Houston National Cemetery
Recipients of the Distinguished Service Medal (US Army)
Recipients of the Air Medal
Recipients of the Meritorious Service Medal (United States)
Recipients of the Defense Distinguished Service Medal
Recipients of the Order of Military Merit (Brazil)
Deaths from Alzheimer's disease
Order of National Security Merit members
Recipients of the Distinguished Flying Cross (United States)
Recipients of the Defense Superior Service Medal